Philandia is a genus of beetles in the family Buprestidae, containing the following species:

 Philandia araucana Germain & Kerremans, 1906
 Philandia valdiviana (Philippi & Philippi, 1860)

References

Buprestidae genera